Chic 'n Swell is a 1982 album by La Bottine Souriante.

Track listing
 "Le Batteux" (The Threshing Mill), La grande gigue simple – 2:58
 "La Tapinie" (The Log Drive), Le reel des voyageurs – 3:50
 "Sur le chemin de mont" (On the Mountain Road),  – 3:05
 "Le Rossignol sauvage" (The Wild Nightingale),  – 3:40
 "Nos braves habitants" (Our Brave Habitants),  – 3:30
 "La Danse des foins" (The Hay Dance),  – 2:45
 "Le Bal chez Ti-Guy" (Ti-Guy's Party),  – 2:45
 "Les Robineux" (The Beggars),  – 1:50
 "Les Patins de Pauline" (Pauline's Skates), Le petit bûcheux – 3:15
 "La Ziguezon" (The Ziguezon),  – 3:38
 "Le Tablier du maçon" (The Builder's Apron), Le reel à Rémi  – 3:25
 "Les Trois capitaines" (The Three Captains),  – 3:00

1982 albums
La Bottine Souriante albums